Yuri Borienko (7 November 1932 – 10 February 1999) was a Russian wrestler and actor, known for his performance as Blofeld's henchman Grunther in the James Bond film On Her Majesty's Secret Service.

Biography
Borienko came to England shortly after the Second World War and began wrestling in 1951 under the name Red Staranoff. Post-1953, he moved to the United States but returned to Britain in 1960, where the following year, he began to wrestle for independents and was signed up by Joint Promotions in 1962. (Borienko and fellow wrestler Mike Marino were matched against American heavyweight Luther Lindsay.)

Working as an actor, Borienko guested in episodes of British TV series including Adam Adamant Lives!, Z-Cars, The Troubleshooters, Department S, The Persuaders!, Jason King, The Protectors, Raffles, The Professionals and Strangers as well as a number of films (see below).

After retiring from acting, Borienko and his family moved to Canada where he died in 1999 from leukaemia. His children include businessman Stefan Kadlubowski (1963–2016) and makeup artist Nina Westbury.

James Bond 
During his audition for the role of James Bond in On Her Majesty's Secret Service, George Lazenby was required to 'fight' Borienko as part of his screen test. During this, Lazenby punched the wrestler, giving him a broken and bloodied nose. This impressed the director Peter R. Hunt and producer Harry Saltzman, winning Lazenby the role of Bond. Borienko was given the role of Grunther as compensation.

Filmography

References

External links

1932 births
1999 deaths
Russian male actors